Novi Sad (see below for other names) is the second largest city in Serbia and the capital of the autonomous province of Vojvodina. Novi Sad is home for 367,121 inhabitants. It is located in the southern portion of the Pannonian Plain on the border of the Bačka and Syrmia geographical regions. Lying on the banks of the Danube river, the city faces the northern slopes of Fruška Gora.

, Novi Sad proper has a population of 231,798 while its urban area (including the adjacent settlements of Petrovaradin and Sremska Kamenica) comprises 277,522 inhabitants. The population of the administrative area of the city totals 367,121 people, according to 2022 census.

Novi Sad was founded in 1694 when Serb merchants formed a colony across the Danube from the Petrovaradin Fortress, a strategic Habsburg military post. In subsequent centuries, it became an important trading, manufacturing and cultural centre, and has historically been dubbed the Serbian Athens. The city was heavily devastated in the 1848 Revolution, but was subsequently rebuilt and restored. Today, along with the Serbian capital city of Belgrade, Novi Sad is an industrial and financial center important to the Serbian economy.

Novi Sad was the European Capital of Culture in 2022 and the European Youth Capital in 2019.

Name 
The name Novi Sad means "new plantation" in Serbian. Its Latin name, stemming from the establishment of Habsburg city rights, is Neoplanta. The official names of Novi Sad in local administration are:

In both Croatian and Romanian, which are official in provincial administration, the city is called Novi Sad. Historically, it was also called Neusatz and Neusatz an der Donau in German.

In its wider meaning, the name Grad Novi Sad refers to the "City of Novi Sad", one of the city-level administrative units of Serbia, which includes Novi Sad proper on the left bank of the Danube, the towns of Sremska Kamenica and Petrovaradin on the right bank and the extensive suburbs of the left bank. Novi Sad can also refer strictly to only the urban areas of the city (Novi Sad proper and the towns of Sremska Kamenica and Petrovaradin), or only to the historical core on the left bank, i.e. Novi Sad proper excluding Sremska Kamenica and Petrovaradin.

History

Older settlements 

Human habitation in the territory of present-day Novi Sad has been traced as far back as the Stone Age. Several settlements and necropolises dating to 5000 BC were unearthed during the construction of a new boulevard in Avijatičarsko Naselje. A settlement was also identified on the right bank of the river Danube in present-day Petrovaradin.

In antiquity, the region was inhabited by Celtic tribes, most notably the Scordisci. Celts had been present in the area since the 4th century BC and founded the first fortress on the right bank of the Danube. Later, in the 1st century BC, the region was conquered by the Romans. During Roman rule, a larger fortress was built in the 1st century, named Cusum, and included in the Roman province of Pannonia.

In the 5th century, Cusum was devastated by Hunnic invasions. By the end of the century, the  Byzantines had rebuilt the town and called it Petrikon or Petrikov after Saint Peter. Slavic tribes such as the Severians, the Obotrites and the Serbs (including the subtribes of the Braničevci and the Timočani) settled the region around Novi Sad, mainly in the 6th and 7th centuries. The Serbs absorbed the aforementioned Slavic groups as well as the Paleo-Balkanic peoples of the region.

In the Middle Ages, the area was controlled by the Ostrogoths, Gepids, Avars, Franks, West Slavic groups, again by the Byzantines, and finally by the Hungarians. It became part of the medieval Kingdom of Hungary between the 11th and 12th centuries. Hungarians began to settle in the area, which before that time had been mostly populated by Slavs. The earliest known mention was as the Hungarian variant Peturwarad or Pétervárad (Serbian: Petrovaradin/Петроварадин), derived from the Byzantine variant, found in documents from 1237. That year, several other settlements were mentioned as existing in the territory of modern-day urban Novi Sad.

From the 13th century to the 16th century, the following settlements existed in the urban territory of the modern-day Novi Sad:
on the right bank of the Danube: Pétervárad (Serbian: Petrovaradin) and Kamanc (Serbian: Kamenica).
on the left bank of the Danube: Baksa or Baksafalva, Kűszentmárton, Bivalyos or Bivalo, Vásárosvárad or Várad, Zajol I (Serbian: Sajlovo I, Gornje Sajlovo, Gornje Isailovo), Zajol II (Serbian: Sajlovo II, Donje Sajlovo, Donje Isailovo), Bistritz (Serbian: Bistrica). Some other settlements existed in the suburbs of Novi Sad: Mortályos (Serbian: Mrtvaljoš), Csenei, Keménd (Serbian: Kamendin), Rév.

An etymology of settlement names reveals that some designations are of Slavic origin, which indicates that the areas were initially inhabited by Slavs, particularly the West Slavs. For example, Bivalo (Bivaljoš) had a large Slavic settlement dating from the 5th–6th centuries. Other names are of Hungarian origin (for example Bélakút, Kűszentmárton, Vásárosvárad, Rév), indicating that the settlements were inhabited by Hungarians before the Ottoman invasion in the 16th century. Some settlement names are of uncertain origin.

Tax records from 1522 show a mix of Hungarian and Slavic names among the inhabitants of these villages, including Slavic names like Bozso (Božo), Radovan, Radonya (Radonja), Ivo, etc. Following the Ottoman invasion in the 16th–17th centuries, some of these settlements were destroyed. Most of the surviving Hungarian inhabitants retreated from the area. Some of the settlements persisted under Ottoman rule and were populated by ethnic Serbs.

Between 1526 and 1687, the region was under Ottoman rule. In 1590, the population of all villages in the territory of present-day Novi Sad numbered 105 houses, inhabited exclusively by Serbs. Ottoman records mention only those who paid taxes, so the number of Serbs who lived in the area (for example, those that served in the Ottoman army) was likely larger than was recorded.

Founding of Novi Sad 

Habsburg rule was aligned with the Roman Catholic doctrine and, as it took over this area near the end of the 17th century, the government prohibited people of Orthodox faith from residing in Petrovaradin. Unable to build homes there, the Serbs of the area founded a new settlement in 1694 on the left bank of the Danube. They initially called it the 'Serb city'. Another name used for the settlement was Petrovaradinski Šanac. In 1718, the inhabitants of the village of Almaš were resettled to Petrovaradinski Šanac, where they founded Almaški Kraj ('the Almaš quarter').

According to 1720 data, the population of Ratzen Stadt was composed of 112 Serbian, 14 German, and 5 Hungarian houses. The settlement officially gained the present names Novi Sad and Újvidék (Neoplanta in Latin) in 1748 when it became a 'free royal city', in German language it was called Neusatz.

The edict that made Novi Sad a 'free royal city' was proclaimed on 1 February 1748. The edict reads:

In the 18th century, the Habsburg monarchy recruited Germans from the southern principalities of the Holy Roman Empire to relocate to the Danube valley. They wanted both to increase the population and to redevelop the river valley for agriculture, which had declined markedly under the Ottomans. To encourage such settlement, the government ensured that the German communities could practice their religion (mostly Catholicism) and use their original German dialect.

Habsburg monarchy 

For much of the 18th and 19th centuries, Novi Sad remained the largest city inhabited by Serbs. The reformer of the Serbian language, Vuk Stefanović Karadžić, wrote in 1817 that Novi Sad was the 'largest Serb municipality in the world'. It was a cultural and political centre for Serbs (see also Serbian Revival), who did not have their own national state at the time. Due to its cultural and political influence, the city became known as the 'Serbian Athens' (Srpska Atina in Serbian). According to 1843 data, Novi Sad had 17,332 inhabitants, of whom 9,675 were Orthodox Christians, 5,724 Catholics, 1,032 Protestants, 727 Jews, and 30 adherents of the Armenian church. The largest ethnic group in the city were Serbs, and the second largest were Germans.

During the Revolution of 1848–49, Novi Sad was part of Serbian Vojvodina, a Serbian autonomous region within the Austrian Empire. In 1849, the Hungarian garrison, located at the Petrovaradin Fortress, bombarded and devastated the city, which lost much of its population. According to the 1850 census, there were only 7,182 citizens left in the city, compared to 17,332 in 1843. Marija Trandafil and her husband paid for some of the rebuilding including two churches. Between 1849 and 1860, Novi Sad was part of a separate Austrian crownland known as the Voivodeship of Serbia and Banat of Temeschwar. After the abolishment of this province, the city was included into the Batsch-Bodrog County. The post office was opened in 1853.

Following the compromise of 1867, Novi Sad was located within the Kingdom of Hungary, the Transleithania, which comprised half of the new Austro-Hungarian Empire. During this time, the Magyarization policy of the Hungarian government drastically altered the demographic structure of the city as the formerly predominantly Serbian population became one with a more mixed character. In 1880, 41.2% of the city's inhabitants used the Serbian language most frequently and 25.9% employed Hungarian. In the following decades, the percentage of Serbian-speakers decreased, while the number of Hungarian-speakers increased. According to the 1910 census, the city had 33,590 residents, of whom 13,343 (39.72%) spoke Hungarian, 11,594 (34.52%) Serbian, 5,918 (17.62%) German and 1,453 (4.33%) Slovak. It is not certain whether Hungarians or Serbs were the larger ethnic group in the city in 1910, since the various ethnic groups (Bunjevci, Romani, Jews, other South Slavic people, etc.) were classified in census results only according to the language they spoke.

Similar demographic changes can be seen in the religious structure: in 1870, the population of Novi Sad included 8,134 Orthodox Christians, 6,684 Catholics, 1,725 Calvinists, 1,343 Lutherans, and others. In 1910, the population included 13,383 Roman Catholics and 11,553 Orthodox Christians, while 3,089 declared themselves as Lutheran, 2,751 as Calvinist, and 2,326 as Jewish.

Serbia and Yugoslavia 

On 25 November 1918, the Assembly of Serbs, Bunjevci and other Slavs of Vojvodina in Novi Sad proclaimed the union of the region of Vojvodina with the Kingdom of Serbia. From 1 December 1918, Novi Sad was part of the Kingdom of Serbs, Croats, and Slovenes; and in 1929, it became the capital of the Danube Banovina, a province of the newly named Kingdom of Yugoslavia. In 1921, the population of Novi Sad numbered 39,122 inhabitants, 16,293 of whom spoke the Serbian language, 12,991 Hungarian, 6,373 German, 1,117 Slovak, etc.

In 1941, Yugoslavia was invaded and partitioned by the Axis powers, and its northern parts, including Novi Sad, were annexed by Hungary. During World War II, about 5,000 citizens were murdered and many others were resettled. During the three days of the Novi Sad raid (21–23 January 1942) alone, Hungarian police killed 1,246 citizens, among them more than 800 Jews, and threw their corpses into the icy waters of the Danube.

The total death toll of the raid was around 2,500. Citizens of all nationalities—Serbs, Hungarians, Slovaks, and others—fought together against the Axis authorities. In 1975 the whole city was awarded the title People's Hero of Yugoslavia.

The Yugoslav Partisans of Syrmia and Bačka entered the city on 23 October 1944. During the military administration of Banat, Bačka and Baranja (17 October 1944 – 27 January 1945), the Partisans killed tens of thousands, mostly Serbs, Germans, and Hungarians, who were perceived as opponents to the new regime.

Novi Sad became part of the new Socialist Federal Republic of Yugoslavia. Since 1945, Novi Sad has been the capital of Vojvodina, a province of the Republic of Serbia. The city went through rapid industrialization and its population more than doubled in the period between World War II and the breakup of Yugoslavia in the early 1990s.

After 1992, Novi Sad became a part of the Federal Republic of Yugoslavia. Devastated by NATO bombardment during the Kosovo War of 1999, Novi Sad was left without any of its three Danube bridges (Žeželj Bridge, Varadin Bridge and Liberty Bridge), communications, water, and electricity. Residential areas were cluster-bombed several times while the oil refinery was bombarded daily, causing severe pollution and widespread ecological damage. In 2003, FR Yugoslavia was transformed into the state union of Serbia and Montenegro. These two states separated in June 2006 (following the May 2006 Montenegrin independence referendum), leaving Novi Sad part of the Republic of Serbia.

Geography 

The city lies on the meander of the river Danube, which is only 350 meters wide beneath the marking stones of Petrovaradin. A section of the Danube-Tisza-Danube Canal marks the northern edge of the wider city centre. The main part of the city lies on the left bank of the Danube in the region of Bačka, while the smaller settlements of Petrovaradin and Sremska Kamenica lie on the right bank, in the region of Srem (Syrmia). The section situated on the left bank of the river lies on one of the southernmost and lowest parts of the Pannonian Plain, while Fruška Gora on the right bank is a horst mountain. Alluvial plains along the Danube are well-formed, especially on the left bank, and in some parts  from the river. The northern part of Fruška Gora is composed of massive landslide zones, although they are largely inactive with the exception of the Ribnjak neighbourhood between Sremska Kamenica and Petrovaradin Fortress.

Climate 
The city experiences four distinct seasons. Autumn is drier than spring, with long sunny and warm periods. Winter is not so severe, with an average of 22 days of complete sub-zero temperature, and averages 22 days of snowfall. Spring is usually short and rainy, while summer arrives abruptly.

The east-southeasterly wind, known as Košava, blows from the Carpathians and brings clear and dry weather. It mostly blows in autumn and winter, in 2 to 3-day intervals. In wintertime, accompanied by snow storms, the winds can cause large snow-drifts.

Settlements 

Novi Sad is a typical Central European town in terms of its architecture. The Town Hall and the Court House were built by Emmerich Kitzweger (1868–1917). The city was almost completely destroyed during the 1848/1849 revolution, so architecture from the 19th century dominates the city centre. Small, older houses used to surround the centre of town, but they are now being replaced by modern, multi-story buildings.

During the socialist period, new city blocks with wide streets and multi-story buildings were constructed around the city core. However, not many communist-style high-rise buildings were erected. The total number of apartment buildings, with ten or more floors, remained at about 50, the rest having mostly three to six floors. From 1962 to 1964, a new boulevard, today called Bulevar oslobođenja, was cut through the older neighbourhoods, establishing major communication lines. Several more boulevards were subsequently built in a similar manner, creating an orthogonal network which replaced the primarily radial structure of the old town. These interventions paved the way for a relatively unhampered growth of the city, which has almost tripled in population since the 1950s. Despite a huge increase in car ownership, traffic congestion is still relatively mild, apart from a few major arteries.

Neighbourhoods 

Some of the oldest neighbourhoods in the city are Stari Grad (Old Town), Rotkvarija, Podbara, and Salajka. The areas of Sremska Kamenica and Petrovaradin, located on the right bank of the Danube, were separate towns in the past, but today belong to the urban area of Novi Sad. Liman, as well as Novo Naselje, are neighbourhoods built during the 1960s, 1970s and 1980s, with contemporary style buildings and wide boulevards (Liman was divided into four sections, numbered I–IV).

New neighbourhoods, like Liman, Detelinara and Novo Naselje, emerged from the fields and forests surrounding the city. Following World War II, tall residential buildings were constructed to house the huge influx of people leaving the country side. Many old houses in the city centre, from the Rotkvarija and Bulevar neighbourhoods, were torn down in the 1950s and 1960s, to be replaced by multi-story buildings.  Since the city has experienced a major construction boom in the last 10 years, some neighbourhoods like Grbavica have completely been transformed.

Neighbourhoods with single family homes are mostly located away from the city centre. Telep, situated in the southwest, and Klisa, in the north, are the oldest such districts. Adice and Veternik, both located west of the downtown area, have significantly expanded during the last 15 years, partly due to an influx of Serb refugees fleeing the Yugoslav wars.

Suburbs 

While Novi Sad's urban municipalities, which include Petrovaradin, Sremska Kamenica and Novi Sad proper, have a combined population of about 277,000, its suburban areas have approximately 65,000 inhabitants. Some 23.7% of the administrative city's total population resides in the suburbs, which consist of 12 settlements and 1 town. The largest numbers live in Futog (pop. 20,000) and in Veternik (pop. 17,000) to the west. Both places have grown bigger over the years, especially during the 1990s, and have physically merged with the city.

Suburbs like Futog are officially classified as an 'urban settlement' (town), while other suburbs are mostly considered to be 'rural''' (village).  Ledinci, Stari Ledinci and Bukovac are all villages located on Fruška Gora’s slopes, with the last two having only one paved road. Stari Ledinci is the most isolated and least populated village belonging to Novi Sad's suburban areas.

Towns and villages in the adjacent municipalities of Sremski Karlovci, Temerin and Beočin share the same public transportation system and are economically tied to Novi Sad.

 Demographics 

Novi Sad is the second largest city in Serbia (after Belgrade), and the largest city in Vojvodina. Since its founding, the population of the city has been constantly increasing. According to the 1991 census, 56.2% of the people who came to Novi Sad from 1961 to 1991 were from Vojvodina, while 15.3% came from Bosnia and Herzegovina and 11.7% from rest of Serbia.

In the 1990s and 2000s, the city experienced significant population growth. According to the 2011 census, the city's population is 231,798, while in its urban area (including adjacent settlements of Petrovaradin and Sremska Kamenica) there are 277,522 inhabitants. Novi Sad's administrative city limits hold 341,625 inhabitants.

 Ethnic groups 
The ethnic composition in the city administrative area (last three censuses):

All of the inhabited places in the municipalities have an ethnic Serb majority, while the village of Kisač has an ethnic Slovak majority.

 Religion 

According to the 2011 census, the population of the administrative area of Novi Sad (comprising both municipalities) included 270,831 Orthodox Christians, 21,530 Catholics, 8,499 Protestants, 4,760 Muslims, 84 Jews, and others. The city is the seat of the Serbian Orthodox Eparchy of Bačka, the seat of the Bishop of the Slovak Evangelical Church of the Augsburg Confession in Serbia and of the Muftiship of Novi Sad of the Islamic Community in Serbia.

 Culture 

In the 19th and early 20th century, Novi Sad was the capital of Serbian culture, earning it the nickname Serbian Athens. During that time, almost every Serbian novelist, poet, jurist, and publisher had lived or worked in Novi Sad at some point in their career. Some of these cultural workers included Vuk Stefanović Karadžić, Mika Antić, Đura Jakšić and Jovan Jovanović Zmaj , among others. Matica srpska, the oldest cultural-scientific institution in Serbia, was moved from Budapest to Novi Sad in 1864, and now contains the second-largest library in the country, the Library of Matica srpska, with over 3.5 million volumes. The Serbian National Theatre, the oldest professional theatre among the South Slavs, was founded in Novi Sad in 1861.

Today, Novi Sad is the second largest cultural centre in Serbia, after Belgrade. Municipal officials have made the city more attractive with numerous cultural events and music concerts. Since 2000, Novi Sad is home to the EXIT festival, one of the biggest music summer festivals in Europe. Other important cultural events include the Sterijino pozorje theatre festival, Zmaj Children Games, International Novi Sad Literature Festival, Novi Sad Jazz Festival, and many others. Novi Sad also hosts a fashion show twice a year, attracting local and international designers. Called Serbia Fashion Week, the event also features the works of applied artists, musicians, interior decorators, multimedia experts and architects.

In addition to the Serbian National Theatre, other prominent playhouses consist of the Novi Sad Theatre, Youth Theatre, and the Cultural Centre of Novi Sad. The Novi Sad Synagogue also houses many cultural events. Other cultural institutions include the Detachment of the Serbian Academy of Science and Art, Library of Matica Srpska, Novi Sad City Library and Azbukum. The city is also home to the Archive of Vojvodina, which has collected numerous documents from the Vojvodina region dating back to 1565.

Novi Sad has several folk song societies, which are known as kulturno-umetničko društvo or KUD. The best known societies in the city are: KUD Svetozar Marković, AKUD Sonja Marinković, SKUD Željezničar, FA Vila and the oldest SZPD Neven, established in 1892.

National minorities express their own traditions, folklore and songs through various societies such as the Hungarian MKUD Petőfi Sándor, Slovak SKUD Pavel Jozef Šafárik, and Ruthenian RKC Novi Sad.

Novi Sad was chosen to be the European Capital of Culture for 2021, however its mandate was moved to 2022 due to the COVID-19 pandemic.

 Cuisine 
Typical Serbian food can be found in Novi Sad, including traditional dishes like ćevapi, burek, kajmak, kiseli kupus, kiflice and pasulj, as well as fish dishes, local cheeses and charcuterie. Restaurants and farmsteads offer fresh produce from local farmers and also regional vintages from Fruska Gora's wineries. Modern alternatives are available at some of the city's top restaurants, which prepare traditional fare with an updated twist.  Pastry shops serve local specialties such as layered cakes made from ground nuts and cream, referred to as 'torta' in Serbian. Desserts also often include raspberries, one of the region's largest exports, and historic Dunavska Street is home to many ice cream parlors.

 Museums 

The city has several museums and galleries, both public and privately owned. The best known institution in the city is the Museum of Vojvodina, founded in 1847, which houses a permanent collection of Serbian culture and life in Vojvodina since ancient times. The Museum of Novi Sad, located in the Petrovaradin Fortress, has a permanent collection featuring the history of the old fortress.

The Gallery of Matica Srpska is the largest and most respected exhibition space in the city, with two galleries in the city centre. Other museums include The Gallery of Fine Arts – Gift Collection of Rajko Mamuzić and The Pavle Beljanski Memorial Collection, featuring one of the most extensive collections of Serbian art from the 1900s until the 1970s.

 Tourism 

Since 2000, the number of tourists visiting Novi Sad each year has steadily risen. During the annual EXIT music festival in July, the city is full of young people from all over Europe. In 2017, over 200,000 visitors from 60 countries came to the festival, attending about 35 concerts. Other events include shows and congresses organized by Novi Sad Fair, a local management company, bringing in many businesspersons and entrepreneurs to the city. Every May, Novi Sad is home to the largest agricultural show in the region, having attracted 600,000 attendees in 2005. The tourist port, near Varadin Bridge in the city centre, welcomes cruise boats from across Europe that travel the Danube river.

The most recognized structure in Novi Sad is the Petrovaradin Fortress, which dominates the skyline and also offers scenic views of the city. The nearby historic neighbourhood of Stari Grad has many monuments, museums, cafes, restaurants and shops.

 Economy 
Novi Sad is the economic centre of Vojvodina, the most fertile agricultural region in Serbia. The city also represents one of the largest economic and cultural hubs in Serbia.

Novi Sad had always been a developed city within the former Yugoslavia. In 1981, its GDP per capita was 172% of the Yugoslav average. During the 1990s, the city, like the rest of Serbia, was severely affected by an internationally imposed trade embargo and hyperinflation of the Yugoslav dinar. The embargo, along with economic mismanagement, led to a decay or demise of once important industrial combines, such as Novkabel (electric cable industry), Pobeda (metal industry), Jugoalat (tools), Albus and HINS (chemical industry). Practically the only viable large facilities remaining today are the oil refinery, located northeast of the town, and the thermal power plant.

The economy of Novi Sad has mostly recovered from that period and grown strongly since 2001, shifting from an industry-driven economy to the tertiary sector. The processes involved in privatizing state and society-owned enterprises, as well as strong private incentives, have increased the share of privately owned companies to over 95% in the district, with small and medium-size enterprises dominating the city's economic development.

The significance of Novi Sad as a financial centre is already proven, by being home to the national headquarters of numerous banks, such as Erste Bank, Vojvođanska banka, and Crédit Agricole; as well as the third largest insurance company in Serbia, DDOR Novi Sad. Furthermore, the city is home to major energy companies like Naftna Industrija Srbije oil company and Srbijagas gas company. It is also the seat of the wheat market.

Novi Sad is also a growing information technology centre within Serbia, second only to Belgrade. As of September 2017, Novi Sad has one of 14 free economic zones established in Serbia.

The following table gives a preview of total number of registered people employed in legal entities per their core activity (as of 2018):

 Politics 

Novi Sad is the administrative centre of the Autonomous Province of Vojvodina, and as such, home to Vojvodina's Government and Provincial Assembly.

The city's administrative bodies include the city assembly as the representative body, as well as the mayor and city government defining the executive bodies. The mayor and city assembly members are chosen through direct elections. The city assembly has 78 seats, while the city government consists of 11 members. The mayor and members of the city's assembly are elected to four-year terms. The city government is elected by the city assembly at the proposal of the mayor.

As of 2022, the mayor of Novi Sad is Milan Đurić of the Serbian Progressive Party. While his party holds the majority of seats in the city assembly, the Socialist Party of Serbia, the Democratic Party of Serbia, as well as other parties and groups, are also represented.

The city of Novi Sad is divided into 47 local communities within two city municipalities, Novi Sad and Petrovaradin, which are separated by the Danube river.

City holidays

The city commemorates the year 1694, when it was established.

Coat of arms
The design consists of three white towers placed in the centre, set against a blue sky. A white dove holding an olive branch flies above the larger middle tower. All three structures have rooftops with crenallations, as well as opened windows and closed gates. Below the towers lies a green background, with a wavy white line depicting the Danube River.

 Society 

 Education 

Novi Sad is one of the most important centres of higher education and research in Serbia, with four universities overall and numerous professional, technical, and private colleges and research institutes, including a law school with its own publication. The largest educational institution in the city is the University of Novi Sad, a public school established in 1960. , it has 14 faculties, 9 of which are located on the main university campus. It is attended by more than 50,000 students and has total staff of nearly 5,000.

Business Academy University and Educons University are private schools also located in the city. Other educational institutions include Novi Sad Open University, offering professional courses in adult education, and the Protestant Theological Seminary.

Regarding primary and secondary education, there are 36 elementary schools (33 regular and 3 special) with about 26,000 students. The secondary school system consists of 11 vocational schools and 4 gymnasiums with almost 18,000 students.

 Media 
Novi Sad has one major daily newspaper, Dnevnik, and among the periodicals, the monthly magazine Vojvodjanski magazin stands out. The city also houses the headquarters of regional public broadcaster, Radio Television of Vojvodina (RTV), and municipal public broadcaster, Novosadska televizija, as well as a few commercial TV stations such as Kanal 9, Panonija and RTV Most. Major local commercial radio stations include Radio AS FM and Radio 021.

Novi Sad is also known for being a publishing centre. The most important publishing houses are Matica srpska, Stilos and Prometej. Well-known journals, in literature and art, include Letopis Matice srpske, the oldest Serbian Journal, Polja, which is issued by the Cultural centre of Novi Sad, and Zlatna greda, published by the Association of Writers of Vojvodina.

The city hosts an annual literature conference, Book Talk.

 Sports 
Founded in 1790, the 'City Marksmen Association became the first sporting organization in Novi Sad. A more widespread interest in competitive sports developed after the Municipal Association of Physical Culture was created in 1959 and when the Spens Sports centre was built in 1981. Today, about 220 sports organizations are active in Novi Sad.

Professional sports in Novi Sad mostly revolve around the Vojvodina multi-sport association. Having won two championships in 1966 and 1989, the FK Vojvodina football club represents the 3rd all-time best team in Serbia, right behind its two Belgrade rivals, Red Star and Partizan.  With 13 championship titles, OK Vojvodina is the top volleyball team in the country. As for handball, RK Vojvodina has won the national championship on multiple occasions.

Athletes from Novi Sad had the honour of participating in the first Olympic Games in Athens. The largest number of Novi Sad competitors, to participate in the Olympics, was at the Atlanta Games. Eleven athletes won 6 medals there.  Three also competed at the 1980 Moscow Games, while two participated in the 1976 Montreal Games and the 1956 Melbourne Games.

Many national and international competitions are held in the city. Novi Sad played host to the European and World Championships in table tennis in 1981 and the 29th Chess Olympiad in 1990. It also welcomed the European and World Championships in sambo, the Balkan and European Championships in judo, the 1987 final match of the Saporta Cup in European basketball, and the final tournament of the European volleyball cup. Furthermore, Novi Sad co-hosted the 2005 European Basketball Championship, as well as hosting the 2017 Volleyball World League matches.https://wkf.net/imagenes/campeonatos/ekf-senior-boletin-53rd-ekf-senior-championships-novi-sad-serbia-may-10-13-001.pdf  The year 2018 saw the city welcome the Senior European Fencing Championships and the European Senior Karate Championships.

The city also holds traditional sporting events such as the Novi Sad marathon, international swimming competitions and many other events. The very first 'MTB Petrovaradin Fortress Cup' took place in 2018, allowing national and regional cyclists to compete. It is also the first mountain bike competition to be held in Serbia.

 Recreation 

Novi Sad's inhabitants engage in a wide range of recreational and leisure activities. With regards to team sports, football and basketball have the highest numbers of participants. Cycling is also popular due to the city's flat terrain and the extensive off-road network, found in nearby mountainous Fruška Gora. Hundreds of commuters cycle the roads, bike lanes and bike paths daily.

Proximity to the Fruška Gora National Park attracts many city dwellers on the weekends. They enjoy the numerous hiking trails, restaurants and monasteries located in and around the mountain area. Occurring on the first weekend of every May, the Fruška Gora Marathon lets hikers, runners and cyclists take advantage of the many hiking trails. During the summer months, citizens from Novi Sad visit Lake Ledinci in Fruška Gora, as well as the numerous beaches situated along the Danube, the largest being Štrand in the Liman neighbourhood. There are also several recreational marinas bordering the river.

 Transportation 

Air transport
Novi Sad currently does not have its own civil airport. The city is about a one-hour drive from Belgrade Nikola Tesla Airport, which connects it with capitals across Europe. Small Čenej Airport north of the city is used for sport and agricultural purposes. There are plans to upgrade it to serve for cargo and small-scale public transport, but the future of this initiative is uncertain.

City transport

The main public transportation system in Novi Sad consists of bus lines, operated by public company JGSP Novi Sad. There are twenty-one urban lines and twenty-nine suburban lines, with main bus station at the northern end of the Liberation Boulevard, next to the Novi Sad railway station. In addition, there are numerous taxi companies serving the city.

The city used to have a tram system, but it was disassembled in 1957.Rail and road transport'Novi Sad lies on the branch B of the Pan-European Corridor X. The A1 motorway connects the city with Subotica to the north and the capital city of Belgrade to the south. It is concurrent with Budapest–Belgrade railroad, which connects it to major European cities.  Starting from 18.3.2022. year there is a high-speed line between Novi Sad and Belgrade with 18 departures every day. The maximum speed is 200 km/h (train called "SOKO") and the distance from Belgrade to Novi Sad is covered in 36 minutes (75 kilometers). Novi Sad is connected with Zrenjanin and Timișoara on the northeast and Ruma on south with a regional highway; there are long-term plans to upgrade it to a motorway or an expressway, with a tunnel under the Fruška Gora shortcutting the Iriški Venac mountain pass.

Three bridges cross the Danube in Novi Sad (as of 2020): Liberty Bridge (Most Slobode) connects Sremska Kamenica with the city proper. Varadin Bridge (Varadinski most) and Žeželj Bridge (Žeželjev most), connects Petrovaradin with city centre, and used for railway and heavy truck traffic. The bridges span the Danube-Tisa-Danube canal, running north of the city centre.

Water transport

The Port of Novi Sad is located on the outskirts of the city, on Danube river. Since may 2019. year it is owned by DP WORLD from UAE. With over million tonnes of load turnover, it is the largest cargo port in Serbia.

International relations

Novi Sad has relationships with several twin towns. One of the main streets in its city centre is named after Modena in Italy; and likewise Modena has named a park in its town centre Parco di Piazza d'Armi Novi Sad. The Novi Sad Friendship Bridge in Norwich, United Kingdom, by Buro Happold, was also named in honour of Novi Sad. Besides twin cities, Novi Sad has many signed agreements on joint cooperation with other European cities (see also: Politics of Novi Sad).

Novi Sad is twinned with:

 Budva, Montenegro
 Changchun, China
 Dortmund, Germany
 Gomel, Belarus
 Ilioupoli, Greece
 Kumanovo, North Macedonia
 Modena, Italy
 Nizhny Novgorod, Russia
 Norwich, England, United Kingdom
 Pécs, Hungary
 Timișoara, Romania
 Toluca, Mexico

Novi Sad is an associate member of Eurocities.

 See also 

NATO bombing of Novi Sad in 1999
Clinical centre of Vojvodina
Festival of Street Musicians
List of places in Serbia
List of cities, towns and villages in Vojvodina
List of people from Novi Sad
Novi Sad Fair
South Bačka District

 References 

 Bibliography 

Boško Petrović – Živan Milisavac, Novi Sad – monografija, Novi Sad, 1987
Milorad Grujić, Vodič kroz Novi Sad i okolinu, Novi Sad, 2004
Jovan Mirosavljević, Brevijar ulica Novog Sada 1745–2001, Novi Sad, 2002
Jovan Mirosavljević, Novi Sad – atlas ulica, Novi Sad, 1998
Mirjana Džepina, Društveni i zabavni život starih Novosađana, Novi Sad, 1982
Zoran Rapajić, Novi Sad bez tajni, Beograd, 2002
Đorđe Randelj, Novi Sad – slobodan grad, Novi Sad, 1997Enciklopedija Novog Sada, sveske 1–26, Novi Sad, 1993–2005
Radenko Gajić, Petrovaradinska tvrđava – Gibraltar na Dunavu, Novi Sad, 1994
Veljko Milković, Petrovaradin kroz legendu i stvarnost, Novi Sad, 2001
Veljko Milković, Petrovaradin i Srem – misterija prošlosti, Novi Sad, 2003
Veljko Milković, Petrovaradinska tvrđava – podzemlje i nadzemlje, Novi Sad, 2005
Veljko Milković, Petrovaradinska tvrđava – kosmički lavirint otkrića, Novi Sad, 2007
Agneš Ozer, Petrovaradinska tvrđava – vodič kroz vreme i prostor, Novi Sad, 2002
Agneš Ozer, Petrovaradin fortress – a guide through time and space, Novi Sad, 200230 godina mesne zajednice "7. Juli" u Novom Sadu 1974–2004 – monografija, Novi Sad, 2004
Branko Ćurčin, Slana Bara – nekad i sad, Novi Sad, 2002
Branko Ćurčin, Novosadsko naselje Šangaj – nekad i sad, Novi Sad, 2004
Zvonimir Golubović, Racija u Južnoj Bačkoj 1942. godine, Novi Sad, 1991
Petar Jonović, Knjižare Novog Sada 1790–1990, Novi Sad, 1990
Petar Jonović – Dr Milan Vranić – Dr Dušan Popov, Znameniti knjižari i izdavači Novog Sada, Novi Sad, 1993Ustav za čitaonicu srpsku u Novom Sadu, Novi Sad, 1993Sveske za istoriju Novog Sada'', sveske 4–5, Novi Sad, 1993–1994

External links 

 
 Novi Sad – Official website 
 City assembly – Official website 
 Virtual tours through Novi Sad

 
Populated places established in 1694
Populated places in Vojvodina
Places in Bačka
Municipalities and cities of Vojvodina
Populated places on the Danube
Port cities in Serbia
South Bačka District
1694 establishments in Europe